Broadhead Farm, also known as the Broadhead-Heller Farm and/or "Wheat Plains," is a historic home located in the Delaware Water Gap National Recreation Area at Lehman Township, Pike County, Pennsylvania. It was established in the late 1770's by Garret Broadhead (1733-1804), a soldier of the American Revolution. The main structure is a large -story, clapboard sided dwelling. It has a slate covered gable roof with dormers. The oldest section is of log construction and it was added on numerous times over the succeeding years.  Also on the property are a variety of modern barns and farm outbuildings.

It was added to the National Register of Historic Places in 1979.

References

Houses on the National Register of Historic Places in Pennsylvania
Houses in Pike County, Pennsylvania
National Register of Historic Places in Pike County, Pennsylvania